Luciana Mazeto is a Brazilian screenwriter, film producer and film director.

Biography 
Luciana Mazeto studied cinema at the Pontifical Catholic University of Rio Grande do Sul (PUCRS) in Porto Alegre. Together with the film director Vinícius Lopes, she directed and wrote several short films that were screened in national and international film festivals.

Career 
In 2012, Luciana Mazeto and Vinícius Lopes founded the production company Pátio Vazio. They are the co-producers of the film festival Cine Esquema Novo in Porto Alegre, in 2016.

In 2020, they produced their first feature film, Irmã. As their mother's health worsens, the two sisters Ana and Julia, decide to travel to the south of Brazil in search of their father. They embark on a journey of initiation that will mark them forever. Irmã had its world premiere in the Generation 14 Plus category at the 70th Berlinale in 2020.

Filmography

Short films 

 2010: Let Me Tell You About Noel
 2011: Purge 
 2012: Berenice 
 2013: Three Mice
 2014: Little Things
 2015: Behind the Shadow
 2016: Under the Door 
 2018: Stone Engravings and the Three-Colored Chickenpox Tale
 2020: The Eyes in the Woods and the Taste in the Water

Feature films 
2020 : Irmã by Vinicius Lopes and Luciana Mazeto, Pátio Vazio

Notes and references

External links 

 Luciana Mazeto on Allociné
 Luciana Mazeto on IMDb
 Official website of Pátio Vazio

Living people
Brazilian film producers
Brazilian screenwriters
Brazilian women film producers
Brazilian women screenwriters
Year of birth missing (living people)